The Katanglad shrew-mouse (Crunomys suncoides), also known as the Kitanglad shrew-mouse is a species of rodent in the family Muridae. It is known only from one specimen taken at 2250 m on Mount Kitanglad, Bukidnon Province, Philippines.

Notes and references

The Katanglad shrew-mouse are mammals with small eyes, slender bodies, long whiskers, and chunky torsos. They prey on earthworms and soil invertebrates.

Further reading

Fur-mites of the family Atopomelidae (Acari: Astigmata) parasitic on Philippine mammals: systematics, phylogeny, and host-parasite relationships.
bioone.org
ncbi.nlm.nih.gov
eol.org

Rats of Asia
Crunomys
Endemic fauna of the Philippines
Fauna of Mindanao
Rodents of the Philippines
Mammals described in 1998